Timaeta is a genus of butterflies in the family Lycaenidae. The species of this genus are found in the Neotropical realm.

Species
Timaeta aepea (Hewitson, 1874)
Timaeta balzabamba (Goodson, 1945)
Timaeta christina Robbins & Busby, 2008
Timaeta cospata Robbins & Busby, 2008
Timaeta eronos (Druce, 1890)
Timaeta gabriela Busby & Robbins, 2008
Timaeta matthewi Busby & Robbins, 2008
Timaeta molinopampa (Bálint & Wojtusiak, 2000)
Timaeta pilosa Robbins & Busby, 2008
Timaeta roberti Busby & Robbins, 2008
Timaeta romero Robbins & Busby, 2008
Timaeta timaeus (C. & R.Felder, 1865)
Timaeta trochus (Druce, 1907)
Timaeta walkeri Robbins & Busby, 2008
Timaeta werneri (Salazar, Vélez, Cardona & Johnson, 1997)

External links
"Timaeta Johnson, Kruse & Kroenlein, 1997" at Markku Savela's Lepidoptera and Some Other Life Forms

Eumaeini
Lycaenidae of South America
Lycaenidae genera